Magnificat Academy was a Catholic middle school and high school located in Warren, Massachusetts, which opened in 2005 in the Parish Hall and Rectory of St. Paul Church with 20 students.  It was operated independent of the Roman Catholic Diocese of Worcester.

All students participated in the choir.  The repertoire of the choir included Gregorian Chant, works of Palestrina, Bach, and Mozart as well as contemporary composers.

The school closed due to lack of finances in 2008.

Discography
 Ave Maria, Recorded at St. Paul's Cathedral in Worcester, Massachusetts May 26, 2006

References

External links
Magnificat Academy and Choir School

Educational institutions established in 2005
Educational institutions disestablished in 2008
Defunct Catholic secondary schools in Massachusetts
2005 establishments in Massachusetts